The Ennore Thermal Power Station is a coal based power plant located in Chennai Ennore, Tamil Nadu.

History
Ennore Thermal Power Station was constructed to serve the purpose of energy generation in the year 1970. It is one of the four major thermal power plants of Tamil Nadu established by TANGEDCO. The necessary coal arrives through ship to the Ennore Port. The Station presently consists of two 60-MW and three 110-MW units. A 500-MW coal-based unit was proposed, and its development started in the month of November 2007. The total cost of the venture was 270 crores. The plant was shut down on 31.03.2017 and will be replaced.

Features
The Power Station has been a major provider of electricity in the state and its production capacity has been improved over the years.
The Ennore Power Station has also garnered various awards from the TANGEDCO. However power deficit seems to be playing an important role for the recent decision. It also has a special treatment plant to dispose the ash slurry in a proper way.

Coal for ETPS is received from MCL (Talchar and Ib Valley), Orissa and ECL, Raniganj, West Bengal. The plant load factor (PLF) for the year 2008–2009 was 49.17 percent.

Capacity

Shut down and Proposed Replacement
After more than forty years the Power Plant was shut down permanently on March 31, 2017. It will be replaced with a single Supercritical unit of 660 MW, also run by the Tamil Nadu Generation and Distribution Corporation Limited (TANGEDCO).
The replacement does not have clearance yet. The plant is opposed by the residents who fear that the new plant will degrade the air quality and lead to a loss of fishing livelihoods.

See also

 List of power stations in India

References

Coal-fired power stations in Tamil Nadu
1970 establishments in Tamil Nadu
Power plants in Chennai
Energy infrastructure completed in 1970